Knattspyrnufélagið Berserkir is an Icelandic football club located in Reykjavík, currently playing in 4. deild karla. The club was founded on 16 January 2007 and is affiliated with Knattspyrnufélagið Víkingur.

References

External links
Club profile on Football Association of Iceland

Football clubs in Iceland
Football clubs in Reykjavík